DXWP-TV, channel 5, is a television station of Southern TV Industries and affiliate of People's Television Network. Its studio, transmitter and broadcast facility is located at Pioneer Avenue, General Santos. Currently the station is inactive.

History
1977 - DXBG-TV channel 8 was launched by the National Media Production Center as Government Television (GTV) under Lito Gorospe and later by then-Press Secretary Francisco Tatad. It is the first television station in Soccksargen.
1980 - GTV was then became Maharlika Broadcasting System (MBS).
February 24, 1986 - Following the People Power Revolution on which it was taken over by pro-Corazon Aquino, MBS was renamed People's Television (PTV).
March 26, 1992 - President Cory Aquino signed Republic Act 7306 turning PTV Network into a government corporation known formally as People's Television Network, Inc. (PTNI) and PTV General Santos moved its frequency from Channel 8 to channel 5 in 1992, which became an affiliate station of Southern TV Industries.
July 16, 2001 - Under the new management appointed by President Gloria Macapagal Arroyo, PTNI adopted the name National Broadcasting Network (NBN) carrying new slogan "One People. One Nation. One Vision." for a new image in line with its new programming thrusts, they continued the new name until the Aquino administration in 2010.
October 6, 2011 – People's Television Network, Inc. (PTNI) became a primary brand National Broadcasting Metwork was retired.
2018 - After it was lasted for twenty six years in General Santos, the station went silent.

Television stations in General Santos
Television channels and stations established in 1985
1985 establishments in the Philippines